Buenoa dactylis is a species of backswimmer first found in Colombia's Pacific coast.

References

Further reading
 PADILLA, DORA NANCY. "Spatial Distribution of the Species of the Genus Buenoa (Hemiptera: Notonectidae) in Tumaco (Nariño, Colombia)." Acta Biológica Colombiana 19.1 (2014): 83-88.

Notonectidae
Insects described in 2010
Arthropods of Colombia